The Songdo IBD Championship was a golf tournament on the Champions Tour. It was played for the first time as the Posco E&C Songdo Championship in September 2010 at the Jack Nicklaus Golf Club Korea in Songdo, South Korea. It was the Champions Tour's first tournament in Asia.

The purse in 2011 was US$3,000,000, with $456,000 going to the winner. This was the largest purse ever for a Champions Tour event.

Winners
Songdo IBD Championship presented by Korean Air
2011  Jay Don BlakePO

Posco E&C Songdo Championship presented by Gale International
2010  Russ CochranPO

Note: PO Denotes win in a playoff

References

External links
Coverage on the Champions Tour's official site

Former PGA Tour Champions events
Golf tournaments in South Korea
Sport in Incheon
POSCO
Autumn events in South Korea
Recurring sporting events established in 2010
Recurring sporting events disestablished in 2011
2010 establishments in South Korea
2011 disestablishments in South Korea